Huanchaco is a popular seaside resort city in province of Trujillo, Peru. Huanchaco is known for its surf breaks, its caballitos de totora and its ceviche, and is near the ancient ruins of Chan Chan. Huanchaco was approved as a World Surfing Reserve by the organization Save The Waves Coalition in 2012  This historic town is part of the tourist circuit called the "Moche Route" or "Ruta Moche".

History

Pre-Columbian era
Huanchaco's original population were indigenous fishermen, who worshipped the moon and a golden fish called Huaca Taska. Some accounts suggest the name "Huanchaco" originate from "Gua-Kocha, a Quechua word meaning "beautiful lake". 
During the period of the Chimú culture, 800 to 1400, Huanchaco was the port for Chan Chan, which was established 4 km away. It was also the main port during Moche period, and was described by Inca Garcilaso de la Vega as the preferred port of the Incas.

Archaeologists led by Gabriel Prieto revealed the largest mass child sacrifice with more than 140 children skeleton and 200 Llamas dating to the Chimú culture after he was informed about some children had found bones in a dune nearby Prieto’s fieldwork in 2011.

According to the researchers' notes in the study, there was cut marks on the sterna, or breastbones some of the children and the llamas. Children’s faces were smeared with a red pigment during the ceremony before their chests had been cut open, most likely to remove their hearts.Remains showed that these kids came from different regions and when the children and llamas were sacrificed, the area was drenched with water.

“We have to remember that the Chimú had a very different world view than Westerners today. They also had very different concepts about death and the role each person plays in the cosmos, perhaps the victims went willingly as messengers to their gods, or perhaps Chimú society believed this was the only way to save more people from destruction” said anthropologists  Ryan Williams.

Colonial era
Following the Spanish conquest of 1534, the Spanish town was founded as "Huanchaco" on January 1, 1535 by the Franciscan friar Alonso of Escarcena and Juan de Barbaran.

Subsequently, Huanchaco functioned as the main port of Trujillo city, but the port closed in 1870. Two decades later Victor Larco Herrera rebuilt the pier exclusively for exporting sugar from businesses in the neighbouring Chicama valley, one of the most important areas of sugar production in the country.

Origin of Ceviche

According to Andrés Tinoco Rondan, an academic researcher at Ricardo Palma University, Huanchaco is the birthplace of the seafood dish ceviche. Oral histories suggest ceviche was prepared with lemons from Simbal (yunga village nearby), with chilli from the Moche River valley and seaweed extracted from the sea.

In Huanchaco the ceviche is often served to tourists with the seaweed called cochayuyo or mococho which is taken from the shores of Huanchaco

Tourism
Huanchaco is visited by foreign tourists, particularly surfers. Several surf events are held and one of the most important each year in January is the Huanchaco longboard. Other nearby attractions include Chan Chan, Mount Campana, a sacred mountain in the Chimu culture and Pampas de Gramalote, a complex for shamanic experiences.

Surfing
In 2012 Huanchaco obtained approval as a World Surfing Reserve by the organization Save The Waves Coalition. This designation is the first awarded to a Latin America town and the fifth in the world. Huanchaco is notable not only for consistent, smooth waves, but also for being the birthplace of the Caballito de totora boat which is regarded as one of the first known surf crafts. Huanchaco's beaches offer smooth and consistent waves, as it is very exposed to all swells. 

The Huanchaco Longboard World Championships is a surfing competition that has taken place since 2010 at the El Elio Beach in Huanchaco, and brings together leading surfers of several countries of the world.

Sandboarding
The sand dunes near the town of Laredo, close to Trujillo are a popular destination for sandboarding.

Swamps of Huanchaco

Swamps of Huanchaco, also known as Wetlands of Huanchaco is an ecological Chimu reserve located in Huanchaco Beach, about 14 km northwest of Trujillo city, Peru. From this ecological reserve the ancient mochica extracted the raw material for the manufacture of the ancient Caballitos de totora used since the time of the Moche for fishing. Currently Huanchaco fishermen still use materials from these swamps to make the traditional boats

Festivals
Carnival of Huanchaco, this carnival has been held since the beginning of the 20th century. Originally villagers performed a carnival emulating the famous Venetian Carnival of the time. Later it became organized by the Club Huanchaco, and now consists of several activities including the crowning of the queen, surf contest, luau party, creativity in the sand, championships of Caballito de totora, and the carnival parade among. In 2012 the carnival parade was held on 25 February.
San Pedro, the patron saint of fishermen at sea, is also called "San Pedrito"; in Huanchaco it is made a traditional "Patacho" which is a giant reed horse. It is celebrated in the month of June.

See also

 Buenos Aires
 Chan Chan
 Puerto Chicama
 Chimu
 Historic Centre of Trujillo
 La Libertad Region
 Lake Conache
 Las Delicias beach
 Marcahuamachuco
 Moche
 Pacasmayo beach
 Puerto Morín
 Salaverry
 San Jose Festival
 Marinera Festival
 Trujillo Province, Peru
 Trujillo Spring Festival
 Trujillo
 Víctor Larco Herrera District
 Virú culture
 Vista Alegre
 Wetlands of Huanchaco
 Wiraquchapampa

References

External links

Location of Huanchaco (Wikimapia)
"Huaca de la luna and Huaca del sol"
"Huacas del Sol y de la Luna Archaeological Complex", Official Website
Information on El Brujo Archaeological Complex
Chan Chan World Heritage Site, UNESCO
Chan Chan conservation project
Website about Trujillo, Reviews, Events, Business Directory
 http://www.huanchacovivo.com

Multimedia

Gallery of Huanchaco by Panoramio, with information of several authors.
 
 
 
 Gallery pictures by Panoramio, Includes Geographical information by various authors
Colonial Trujillo photos

Beaches of Peru
Surfing locations
Surfing locations in Peru
Fishing communities
Beaches of Trujillo, Peru
Cities in La Libertad Region
Localities of Trujillo, Peru